"Everytime You Sleep" is the first single from Deacon Blue's album Homesick. It reached number 64 on the UK Singles Chart in April 2001.

The first B-side on CD single 1 is "Hey Craig", a rock/alternative rock track with classic Deacon Blue slice-of-life lyrics. The other B-side is "When You Were a Boy You Were a Beautiful Boy", a pop track with the chorus sung by Lorraine McIntosh.

The CD single 2 contains live versions of "Twist and Shout" and "Cover from the Sky", both recorded at the BBC Radio Theater in November, 1999.

Track listing
All songs written by Ricky Ross, except where noted:

Charts

References

Deacon Blue songs
2001 singles
Songs written by Ricky Ross (musician)
1999 songs
Chrysalis Records singles